The National Library for Children and Young Adults (NLCY) is a branch library of the National Library of Korea, that aims to provide information services and reading promotion services to children and young adults, located in Tehaeran-ro 7-gil, Gangnam-gu, Seoul. 

As Korea’s representative library specialized for children and young adults, NLCY was opened on 28 June 2006. Because the six-story library building (4 ground floors and 2 underground floors) is located near the Gangnam Station, it provides easy access to people of all ages, including children, young adults, and adults. The library collects knowledge and information resources on children and young adult fields and as of May 2021, the library is in possession of 715,066 volumes in total; including 520,851 volumes of oriental books, 80,400 volumes of western books, 17,459 volumes of periodicals, 96,356 units of non-books. The collection covers not only children and young adult materials, but also research materials for researchers in the relevant field. Also, NLCY implements projects to develop reading culture contents for children and young adults and to support local public libraries and school libraries.  

Aiming to cultivate human resources with creativity and convergence in relation to the Fourth Industrial Revolution, NLCY opened the Future Dream Hope Factory - a library makerspace – and runs various library-based creative programs that graft books and ICT. In 2020, the AR Center was established within the library in order to provide tangible reading activities for children and young adults in the Fourth Industrial Revolution and 5G Era, and programs with convergence contents featuring ‘books’ and ‘stories’ are developed and run in the Center.

History 

2004 Conducted a study on the operation of the National Library for Children and Young Adults 

2005 Inauguration of the Founding TF of the National Library for Children and Young Adults

2006 Opening of the National Library for Children and Young Adults

2009 Opening of the Interactive Storytelling Room and Dokdo Experiencing Room

2011 Installation of the Ma Hae Song Private Collection

2012 Installation of the Cho Heun Pa Private Collection

2017 Installation of the Hong Sung Chan Private Collection

2019 Opening of the Future Dream Hope Factory

2020 Establishment of the AR Center

Organization

Director General 
 Administration Division
 Receipt and sending, controlling, release and preservation of documents 
 Issues on personnel affairs, office regulations, education and training, pension, and civil complaint 
 Security; and official seal and compilation
 Salary; and budget, accounting and settlement of accounts
 Management of national property and goods
 Duties on parking lots and vehicle operation
 Management on building and facilities
 Adjustment, review and analysis of project plans 
 Establishment, revision, abolition of provision by statute
 Issues that are not under provision of other divisions
 Planning and Cooperation Division
 Planning and implementation of library development
 Duties on reading promotion for children and young adults
 Cooperation and providing support to domestic related organizations 
 Issues on operation of the Library Service Counsel for Children and Young Adults 
 Exchange and cooperation with oversea libraries for children and young adults
 Tasks related to strengthening the ability of librarians who serve children and young adults
 Public relations affairs
 Release and supply of the NLCY periodical The Library Story
 Library Service Division
 Operation of the collection rooms at the library
 Research and provision on reference in the children and young adult fields
 Acquisition
 Management and operation of the stocks
 Running reading culture programs
 Data processing and digitization 
 Library tour

Floor plans 
 1F: Children’s Collection, Dream Makerspace, Family Makerspace, Lactation Room, and Information Desk
 2F: Hope Makerspace, Interactive Storytelling Room, Space Imagination, Space Hope,and Exhibition Hall 
 3F: Research Materials,and Stacks
 4F: Picture Book Room with AR(Augmented Reality), Reading Discussion Rooms, Seminar Room, and Auditorium
 B1: AR(Augmented Reality) in Library, and Children’s Dokdo Experience Room LIVEary
 B2: Library Cafeteria(currently closed due to COVID19)

Collection Statistics 
 Oriental books (Total: 520,851)
 Humanities: 348,313
 Social science: 71,069
 Natural science: 101,469

 Western books (Total: 80,400)
 Humanities: 66,098
 Social science: 7,915
 Natural science: 6,387

 Periodicals (Total: 17,459)
 Humanities: 12,943
 Social science: 3,994
 Natural science: 522

 Non-books (Total: 96,356)
 Humanities: 72,501
 Social science: 14,886
 Natural science: 8,969

See also 
 National Library of Korea

Press releases 

 100 books recommended by the National Library for Children and Young Adults 
 A national library for children and Young adults

References

External links 
 National Library for Children and Young Adults – Official website

Children's libraries